Cassville R-IV School District is a school district headquartered in Cassville, Missouri.

It includes the communities of Cassville, Arrow Point, Butterfield, Eagle Rock, Emerald Beach, and Golden. An island in the Shell Knob census-designated place also falls in the district boundaries.

History
In 2001 the district stopped allowing the use of corporal punishment.

Merlyn Johnson became superintendent in 2011. In 2022 the district had 1,900 students. That year the district began using corporal punishment again in cases where parents approve of the option. The district did this because several area parents wanted that option.

Schools
 Cassville High School
 Cassville Middle School
 Cassville Intermediate School
 Eunice Thomas Elementary School

References

Further reading

External links
 Cassville R-IV School District
Barry County, Missouri
School districts in Missouri